Donald McPherson or Donald Macpherson may refer to:

Donald McPherson (figure skater) (1945–2001), Canadian figure skater
Don McPherson (born 1965), American academic and former NFL and CFL football quarterback
Don Macpherson (journalist), Canadian journalist
Don MacPherson (broadcast executive) (died 1998), Canadian broadcast executive
Don Macpherson (born 1954), British screenwriter
Donald Mighton McPherson (1918–1973), Canadian sports executive, businessman and politician in Saskatchewan
Donald McPherson (singer), original singer and co-founder of the 1970s R&B band The Main Ingredient
Donald McPherson (photographer) (born 1969), fashion photographer
Donald Macpherson (British Army officer), army officer who fought in the American Revolution
Donald Macpherson (piper), bagpipe player
Donald Macpherson Baillie, Scottish theologian, ecumenist, and parish minister